Claude Edward Wilborn (September 1, 1912 – November 13, 1992) was a Major League Baseball right fielder who played for one season. He played for the Boston Bees in five games during the 1940 season.

External links 

1912 births
1992 deaths
Baseball players from North Carolina
Major League Baseball right fielders
Boston Bees players